This list of the tallest buildings and structures in Preston ranks skyscrapers and structures in Preston, England by height. It is also the 8th tallest free-standing structure in North West England (behind various buildings in Manchester, Liverpool and Blackpool), and the tallest church in the United Kingdom (excluding cathedrals). There are currently no buildings under construction or approved for construction that will take the title from it.

Until they were demolished in 1983, the tallest structures in Preston were the twin chimneys of the Courtaulds textile factory at Red Scar, Ribbleton.

Tallest buildings and structures
An equal sign (=) following a rank indicates the same height between two or more buildings.

Tallest under construction, approved and proposed

Approved

Proposed

References

Preston
tallest buildings and structures in Preston
Preston